The FIL European Luge Natural Track Championships 1975 took place in Feld am See, Austria.

Men's singles

Women's singles

Niederscheider won her third gold in the last four natural track European championships and fourth in the past five.

Men's doubles

Medal table

References
Men's doubles natural track European champions
Men's singles natural track European champions
Women's singles natural track European champions

FIL European Luge Natural Track Championships
1975 in luge
1975 in Austrian sport
Luge in Austria
International sports competitions hosted by Austria